Redmond Roche ( – after 1654) was an Irish politician who sat for Cork County in the Parliament of 1640–1649. He was a Protestant during his earlier life but joined the Confederateses in 1642.

Birth and origins 

Redmond was born about 1610, probably at Castletownroche in Munster, Ireland. Redmond was the fifth and youngest son of David Roche and his wife Joan Barry. His father had succeeded in 1600 as the 7th Viscount Fermoy. As son of a viscount, Redmond was entitled to the honorific "The Honourable" from birth. His father's family, the Roches, were Old English and descended from Adam de Rupe who had come to Ireland from Wales with Robert FitzStephen during the Anglo-Norman invasion of Ireland.

Redmond's mother was a daughter of James FitzRichard Barry, 3rd Viscount Buttevant. Redmond's mother's family, the de Barrys, were Old English like his father's. They descended from Philip de Barry, who had come to Ireland from Wales in 1183.

Redmond was one of nine siblings, who are listed in his father's article. Of note are here his eldest brother, Maurice, the future 8th Viscount Fermoy, and his eldest sister, Helen, who would become the second wife of Charles MacCarthy, 1st Viscount Muskerry.

Marriages 
Roche married first Jane Dowdall, the third daughter of Sir John Dowdall and his wife Elizabeth Southwell.

Redmond and Jane had one daughter:
Jane, who married Richard Waller, Esquire, of Dublin.

His first wife died before 1638.

He married secondly, after 1636, Alice Smith, widow of William Wiseman of Bandon (died 1636), daughter of Sir Richard Smith of Ballinatray and his wife Mary Boyle, sister of Richard Boyle, 1st Earl of Cork. Alice's first husband had been MP for Bandonbridge in the Irish Parliament of 1634–1635, the 1st Irish Parliament of King Charles I.

Nothing is known about children he may have had from the second marriage.

It is significant that both wives were Protestants.

Parliament 
Roche was elected to the Irish Parliament of 1640–1649, the 2nd Irish Parliament of King Charles I, in an by-election held to replace Donough MacCarty in one of the two seats for Cork County. MacCarty had to vacate his seat in the Commons as he had on 20 February 1641 succeeded as the 2nd Viscount of Muskerry and moved to the House of Lords. Roche contested and won the resulting by-election some time early in 1641.

MacCarty was Roche's nephew by marriage Sir Donough MacCarty, who had been elected as member (MP) for Cork County. MacCarty's father, the 1st Lord Muskerry had in 1599 married Roche's eldest sister Helen as his second wife. Helen was thus MacCarty's stepmother and Roche was his uncle by marriage.

County MPs were then known as knights of the shire. Traditionally they had to be knights and the MacCartys had arranged for Donough to be knighted before his first term in the Irish Parliament of 1634–1635. Roche had never been knighted and therefore became a knight of the shire who was only an esquire. This was already well accepted in the 17th century.

Roche probably sat from May 1641 to June 1642. When he arrived, Thomas Wentworth, 1st Earl of Strafford, the Lord Lieutenant
was about to be executed (12 May 1641) or this had just been done. Ireland was ruled (since 10 February 1641) by the joint Lord Justices Sir William Parsons, 1st Baronet of Bellamont and John Borlase.

The parliamentarian records show that at the time Roche lived at Caherduggan Castle, a tower house that stood along the road between Mallow and Doneraile.

Irish wars 
Phelim O'Neill launched the Irish Rebellion of 1641 from the northern province of Ulster in October 1641. Redmond's brother Maurice, Lord Fermoy, was one of the first of the Catholic noblemen of Munster to join the rebellion and was its leader in the early times. Roche initially supported William St Leger and accompanied him in December 1641 on his expedition into County Waterford to repress the rebellion there, but later followed his family into the rebellion despite his links to the Boyles through his second wife. On 22 June 1642 Roche was expelled from parliament for having joined the rebels. Lady Dowdall, his mother in law by his first wife, Jane Dowdall defended Kilfinny Castle in 1642 against the insurgents but had to surrender it on 29 July 1642.

Roche surprised and seized Caherduggan Castle for the insurgents in April 1644.

Death 
Redmond Roche died after 1654.

Notes and references

Notes

Citations

Sources 

 
 
  – (for MacCarty and Roche)
  – Great Britain: Pack to Yuille; Ireland: Adams to Young (for Smyth of Ballynatray)
 
 
 
 
 
  – (for timeline)
 
 
 
 
  – Viscounts, barons
  – Parliaments & Biographies (PDF downloadable from given URL)
 
 
 
 
  – (Preview)
  – 1641 to 1643

17th-century deaths
Irish MPs 1639–1649
Year of birth uncertain
Year of death uncertain